Legaia 2: Duel Saga, known as  in Japan, is a turn-based role-playing video game and sequel to Legend of Legaia.

Reception

The game had an average score of 70.46% at GameRankings based on 40 reviews and 67% at Metacritic for 21 reviews. Famitsu ranked the game on 6th and sold 40,302 copies. It was ranked 198th by Dengeki Online and sold 53,808 copies.

References

2001 video games
Action role-playing video games
Adventure games
Eidos Interactive games
Fantasy video games
PlayStation 2 games
PlayStation 2-only games
Role-playing video games
Sony Interactive Entertainment games
Video games developed in Japan
Video games scored by Yasunori Mitsuda
Video games scored by Michiru Ōshima
Video games scored by Hitoshi Sakimoto
Video game sequels